Wagner Ribeiro may refer to:

 Wagner Ribeiro (football agent), Brazilian football agent
 Wagner Ribeiro (footballer) (born 1987), Croatian footballer